"Kingdom of Doom" is a song by the British alternative rock supergroup the Good, the Bad & the Queen, made up of Damon Albarn, Paul Simonon, Simon Tong and Tony Allen and is the fourth track on their 2007 album The Good, the Bad & the Queen (see 2007 in British music).

The song was also released as the band's second single in January 2007. Note that the single release, issued a week before the album came out, quite clearly credits the artist as The Good, The Bad & The Queen, although Albarn later claimed the band was unnamed, and that The Good, The Bad & The Queen was simply the name of the album.

Upon release, the single charted at #20, the only one of the band's three singles to reach the Top 20.

Track listings
Promo CD CDRDJ6732
"Kingdom of Doom" - 2.42
Gatefold 7" R6732
"Kingdom of Doom" - 2:42
"The Good, the Bad & the Queen" (live at The Tabernacle) - 4:22
Red vinyl 7" RS6732
"Kingdom of Doom" - 2:42
"Start Point (Sketches of Devon)" - 4:47
CD CDR6732
"Kingdom of Doom" - 2:42
"Hallsands Waltz (Sketches of Devon)" - 2:55
"The Bunting Song (live at The Tabernacle) - 3:57
Download
"Kingdom of Doom" (live at The Roundhouse) - 3:20

Packaging
The artwork for the red vinyl 7" format of the single was created by the band's bassist Paul Simonon, making reference to the building in which the group recorded the video.

Chart positions

Personnel
Damon Albarn: Vocals, Piano, Organ, Synthesizers
Simon Tong: Guitars
Paul Simonon: Bass Guitar
Danger Mouse: Tambourine, Windchimes
Tony Allen: Drums

Track reviews
NME.com - Reviews - The Good, The Bad & The Queen: Kingdom of Doom
The Downloader

References

External links
"Kingdom of Doom" (link is no longer in use) songography page at The Good, The Bad & The Queen unofficial fansite.
"Kingdom of Doom" (link is no longer in use) discography page at The Good, The Bad & The Queen unofficial fansite.

2006 songs
2007 singles
The Good, the Bad and the Queen songs
Song recordings produced by Danger Mouse (musician)
Parlophone singles
Songs written by Damon Albarn